Patrick J. Ryan (January 19, 1861 – February 29, 1940) was an American lawyer, politician, and judge from New York.

Life 
Ryan was born on January 19, 1861, in LaFayette, New York, the son of Irish immigrant Martin Ryan and Margaret Burke. In 1867, the family moved to Pompey. After graduating from the Pompey Academy at 17, he spent the next two years teaching in Pompey.

In 1884, Ryan graduated at the top of his class at St. Bonaventure University in Allegany. He then moved to Syracuse, where he studied law in the law offices of Goodelle & Nottingham and George W. and Michael E. Driscoll. He was admitted to the bar in 1886.

In 1891, Ryan was elected to the New York State Assembly as a Democrat, representing the Onondaga County 1st District. He served in the Assembly in 1892. While in the Assembly, he introduced a bill that created the Syracuse Municipal Court. Upon the court's creation in 1893, Governor Roswell P. Flower appointed him as a judge. He served on the Municipal Court for the next 47 years, longer than any other judge in Syracuse, and was still serving as judge when he died.

Ryan was a member of the Catholic Mutual Benefit Association, the Catholic Business League, and the Citizens' Club. His children were Charles, Alfred, George, Alice, and Mrs. M. J. Clarey.

Ryan died from a stroke at St. Joseph's Hospital on February 29, 1940. He was buried in St. Agnes Cemetery.

References

External links 
The Political Graveyard

1861 births
1940 deaths
People from Pompey, New York
Lawyers from Syracuse, New York
Politicians from Syracuse, New York
St. Bonaventure University alumni
19th-century American politicians
Democratic Party members of the New York State Assembly
New York (state) state court judges
Catholics from New York (state)
American people of Irish descent
Burials in New York (state)